The men's K-2 1000 metres event was a pairs kayaking event conducted as part of the Canoeing at the 1992 Summer Olympics program. The official report did not make clear on the third repechage, two semifinals, and final which events were the men's K-2 1000 m event and the men's K-4 1000 m event and would thus create confusion to the average reader.

Medalists

Results

Heats
27 crews entered in four heats. The top two finishers from each of the heats advanced directly to the semifinals. One crew did not finish while the remaining teams were relegated to the repechages.

Repechages
The top three crews in each of the three repechages and the fastest fourth-place finisher advanced to the semifinals.

Semifinals
The top four finishers in each of the two semifinals and the fastest fifth-place finisher advanced to the final.

Final
The final was held on August 8.

References
1992 Summer Olympics official report Volume 5. pp. 139–40. 
Sports-reference.com 1992 K-2 1000 m results.
Wallechinsky, David and Jaime Loucky (2008). "Canoeing: Men's Kayak Pairs 1000 Meters". In The Complete Book of the Olympics: 2008 Edition. London: Aurum Press, Limited. p. 476.

Men's K-2 1000
Men's events at the 1992 Summer Olympics